Edward Thomas Bennett (10 August 1897–1957) was an English footballer who played in the Football League for Manchester City, Norwich City, Swansea Town and Wrexham.

References

1897 births
1957 deaths
English footballers
Association football defenders
English Football League players
Bristol City F.C. players
Swansea City A.F.C. players
Wrexham A.F.C. players
Manchester City F.C. players
Norwich City F.C. players